Union Episcopal Church, also known as the English Church,   is a historic church located on Old Church Road in Claremont, New Hampshire, in the United States. Built in 1773, it is the oldest surviving Episcopal church building in New Hampshire and is also the state's oldest surviving building built exclusively for religious purposes. It is still an active parish in the Episcopal Diocese of New Hampshire. On February 1, 1980, it was added to the National Register of Historic Places.

Early history

The parish was organized in 1771 and chartered by the New Hampshire legislature in 1794 as Union Church Parish. At that time local Episcopalians and Congregationalists were considering uniting to hire one minister to serve both groups, but this never happened. The next year the Rev. Daniel Barber, who had once been a Congregational minister, became Union's rector. His son, the Rev. Virgil Barber, also became an Episcopal priest, but left the church in 1816 to become a Jesuit priest and to later found St. Mary's Parish in Claremont, the first Roman Catholic church in New Hampshire.

When the church was built, it did not originally have a tower, and was a relatively modest structure despite its massive roof framing timbers. These interior additions were removed in 1850 and replaced by the present altar configuration. The property also includes a relatively rare set of period horse sheds.

See also

 National Register of Historic Places listings in Sullivan County, New Hampshire
 New Hampshire Historical Marker No. 57: Union Church

References

External links
 National Register listings for Sullivan County
 National Register nomination information
 Catholic Encyclopedia

Churches on the National Register of Historic Places in New Hampshire
Episcopal church buildings in New Hampshire
Buildings and structures in Claremont, New Hampshire
Churches in Sullivan County, New Hampshire
National Register of Historic Places in Sullivan County, New Hampshire